Irish moss may refer to:
 Chondrus crispus, a commonly gathered seaweed; a clarifying agent in beer brewing
 Mastocarpus stellatus, a less commonly gathered seaweed
 Sagina subulata, a terrestrial plant with needle-like leaves
 Soleirolia soleirolii, a terrestrial plant with round leaves
 Arenaria verna, a terrestrial plant in the genus Arenaria
 Gracilaria, a genus of seaweed
 Irish moss (drink), a beverage in Jamaican cuisine made from Gracilaria
 Gelidium amansii, a genus of seaweed which yields Agar Agar